Buir is a railway station situated at Kerpen, Rhein-Erft-Kreis in the German state of North Rhine-Westphalia on the Cologne–Aachen railway.

It was opened in 1841 with two platform tracks at an island platform and a passing track. A malt factory located next to the station formerly had a siding. It was rebuilt in 2002 with the construction of the S-Bahn tracks and has two side platforms north and south of the S-Bahn tracks. The northern side platform is separated from the mainline tracks by a noise barrier. Access to the northern platform is via an underpass.

It is served by Rhine-Ruhr S-Bahn lines S13 between Sindorf or Düren and Troisdorf and by S19 between Düren and Hennef (Sieg), Blankenberg (Sieg), Herchen or Au (Sieg). Together these provide two services an hour to Cologne on weekdays and Saturdays and once an hour on Sundays and public holidays. It is classified by Deutsche Bahn as a category 5 station.

References 

S13 (Rhine-Ruhr S-Bahn)
Rhine-Ruhr S-Bahn stations
Buildings and structures in Rhein-Erft-Kreis
Railway stations in Germany opened in 1841